The 2010–11 Bossier-Shreveport Mudbugs season was the 10th season of the Central Hockey League (CHL) franchise in Bossier City, Louisiana.

Regular season

Conference standings

Awards and records

Awards

Milestones

Transactions

Roster

See also
 2010–11 CHL season

References

External links
 2010–11 Bossier-Shreveport Mudbugs season at Pointstreak

B
B
Bossier-Shreveport Mudbugs